Chi Cheng may refer to:

Chi Cheng (athlete) (or Ji Zheng; born 1944), Taiwanese track and field athlete
Chi Cheng (musician) (1970–2013), bassist for the Deftones

See also
Cheng Chi (1760–1802), or Zheng Qi, Chinese pirate